Allahabad is a Lok Sabha (parliamentary) constituency in the Indian state of Uttar Pradesh.

Allahabad saw two MPs elected and became the prime minister. Lal Bahadur Shastri became the prime minister during 1964–1966. V. P. Singh was elected twice from this constituency and later went on to become the prime minister.

Vidhan Sabha Segments

Members of Lok Sabha

^ denotes Bye-poll

Election results

2019 elections

2014 elections

2009 elections

2004 elections

1999 elections

1998 elections

1996 elections

1991 elections

1989 elections

1988 bye-poll elections

1984 elections

1977 elections

1962 elections

1957 elections

See also
 List of mayors of Allahabad
 List of constituencies of the Lok Sabha

References 

Lok Sabha constituencies in Uttar Pradesh
Politics of Allahabad